Christopher Tait, also known as Tait Nucleus?, is an American singer, songwriter and musician. He is best known as the synthesizer player of the rock band Electric Six and the founder of Passenger Recovery. Although he was credited as an associate on Fire, it wasn't until the band's lineup change in 2002 when he officially joined. His inclusion took the group from a five-piece to a six-piece band, rendering the joke of their name (Electric Six despite only featuring five members) redundant.

Discography

Electric Six

Dubai Bros.
Tait produces remixes under the Dubai Bros.

Ghost City
Ghost City was a band featuring Tait on keyboard and vocals. They were active from 2005 until 2007.

They released one album, the self-titled Ghost City in 2008.

Belle Ghoul
Tait is a founding member of the band Belle Ghoul, started in 2011.

They released their first album Rabbit's Moon & Doomsday in 2014.

Laser Destroyer Team
Tait is a founding member of the band Laser Destroyer Team, started in 2014, alongside Keith Thompson (aka Smörgåsbord, Electric Six's longest serving bassist), Chad Thompson (who had previously worked with Electric Six on "Heartbeats and Brainwaves" and Shaun Hatton.

The band specifically produce music for video games.

Discography

Passenger Recovery
Tait founded Passenger Recovery as a service that provides resources for people recovering from addiction while on the road. In an interview with The Spill Magazine, Tait explained how  the project started: "Passenger Recovery started basically from personal experience. So we bought this house in Detroit where travelling musicians can go to have a sober green room. There is recovery reading, chargers, coffee and most importantly peace and quiet.”

Passenger set out to create that network and provide easy access to the help those in need when their usual support systems are miles and miles away. In an article Tait wrote for the creative collective Nothing in the Rulebook, he said that he hoped his own personal  experiences of addiction would  mean the project worked  for others finding themselves in a similar situation: "I’m not alone, and much as my ego would like me to be the only single “tortured artist” on the planet that’s ever dealt with this, I’m not. We’re everywhere [...] Our hope is to present a united front where artists from all walks of life can stand together to support those who have recognized issues or concerns in their own lives."

Since the project began,  a number of other  creative artists have become involved or  pledged their support to the campaign, including Flogging Molly, Patti Smith, The Sword, the Flint Institute of Arts, Wayne State Press, and Lol Tolhurst.

Filmography

Personal life 
As of 2020, Tait lives in Detroit, Michigan, with his wife.

References

External links

Passenger Recovery

Living people
American male songwriters
American male singers
Year of birth missing (living people)